The 551st Special Operations Squadron is a current Special Operations Squadron of the United States Air Force, assigned to the Air Force Special Operations Air Warfare Center until 2017 and then assigned to the 492nd Special Operations Wing.  It was based out of Cannon AFB, New Mexico. The 551st had previously been based at Kirtland AFB, New Mexico as an Air Education and Training Command (AETC) unit within the 58th Special Operations Wing from 15 March 1976 until its inactivation on 10 May 2007.

The squadron was reactivated in 2009 and assigned to Air Force Special Operations Command (AFSOC) to train aircrews on the MC-130 and AC-130.  It was inactivated again on 15 Jun 2021.

History
The 551st was originally designated the 1551st Flying Training Squadron, and was assigned to the 1550th Aircrew Training and Test Wing, 1550th Combat Crew Training Wing. In 1994, it was redesignated the 551st Special Operations Squadron, and was reassigned to the 58th Special Operations Wing.

The 551st conducted helicopter training until it was inactivated in 2007. It is also responsible for special operations contingencies, exercises, and humanitarian rescue missions. The Squadron conducted training on the Pave Low helicopter, but suspended these operations due to the looming retirement of the helicopter.

Lineage
 Designated as the 1551st Flying Training Squadron on 1 April 1971 and activated
 Redesignated 551st Flying Training Squadron on 1 October 1991
 Redesignated 551st Special Operations Squadron on 1 April 1994
 Inactivated on 10 May 2007
 Activated on 25 July 2009
 Inactivated on 15 Jun 2021

Assignments
 1550th Aircrew Training and Test Wing (later 1550th Combat Crew Training Wing), 1 April 1971
 542d Operations Group, 1 October 1991
 58th Operations Group, 1 Apr 1994 – 10 May 2007
 Air Force Special Operations Training Center 25 July 2009
 492d Special Operations Training Group, 17 May 2017

Stations
 Hill Air Force Base, Utah, 1 April 1972
 Kirtland Air Force Base, New Mexico, 15 March 1976 – 10 May 2007
 Cannon Air Force Base, New Mexico, 25 July 2009 – 15 Jun 2021

Aircraft

 Sikorsky HH-3 Jolly Green Giant, 1971-1992
 Kaman HH-43 Huskie, 1971-1975
 Sikorsky HH-53 Super Jolly Green Giant, 1971-1987
 Sikorsky MH-53J Pave Low III, 
 Lockheed HC-130 Hercules, 1973-1987
 Bell UH-1 Huey, 1987-2007
 HH-60 Pave Hawk, 1990-2007
 Lockheed MC-130W Combat Spear, 2009-2021
 Lockheed AC-130H Spectre, 2009-2015
 General Atomics MQ-1 Predator, 2009-2021
 Lockheed AC-130W Stinger II, 2009-2021
 Lockheed MC-130J Combat Shadow II, 2009-2021
 General Atomics MQ-9 Reaper, 2009-2021
 Dornier C-146 Wolfhound, 2009-2021
 Pilatus U-28, 2009-2021
 PZL C-145 Skytruck, 2009-2021

Decorations

Air Force Outstanding Unit Award
 1 April 1974 – 31 May 1976
 1 April 1976 – 31 March 1978
 1 July 1985 – 30 June 1987
 1 July 1987 – 30 June 1989
 1 January 1993 – 30 June 1994
 1 July 1994 – 31 December 1995
 1 July 1996 – 30 June 1998
 1 July 1998 – 30 June 2000
 1 July 2001 – 30 June 2002
 1 July 2002 – 30 June 2003
 1 July 2009 – 23 May 2011

References
 Notes

External links
 The PAVE Cave (unofficial PAVE LOW website)

551
Military units and formations in New Mexico